Aksu or Aqsu (Turkic: "white water") may refer to:

People
 Aksu Hanttu (born 1979), Finnish musician, record producer and sound engineer
 Aksu (surname)

Places

Armenia
 Akhsu, Armenia

Azerbaijan
 Agsu Rayon, a district of Azerbaijan
 Agsu (city), a city in the district
 Ağsu FK, a football club based in the city

China
 Aksu Prefecture, a prefecture in Xinjiang Uyghur Autonomous Region of China
 Aksu, Xinjiang, the capital of Aksu Prefecture

Iran
 Aqsu, Ardabil, a village in Ardabil Province
 Aq Su Rural District, an administrative subdivision of Golestan Province

Kazakhstan
 Aksu, Kazakhstan, a city in Pavlodar Province of Kazakhstan
 Aksu, Almaty, a village in Almaty Province of Kazakhstan
 Aksu District, Almaty Province, a district of Almaty Province
 Aksu Canyon, a canyon in the Tian Shan mountain range

Kyrgyzstan
 See Ak-Suu (disambiguation)

Turkey
 Aksu, Antalya, a municipal town in southwestern Turkey, in the district and province of Antalya
 Aksu, Araç
 Aksu, Çelikhan, a village in Çelikhan district, Adıyaman Province
 Aksu, Giresun, a village in Dereli district of Giresun Province 
 Aksu, Gölyaka
 Aksu, Hasankeyf, a village in Hasankeyf district, Batman Province
 Aksu, Isparta, a town in southwestern Turkey, in the district of Isparta
 Aksu, Burdur
 Aksu, İspir
 Aksu, Kestel
 Aksu, Nallıhan, a village in Nallıhan district, Ankara Province
 Aksu, Nazilli, a village in Nazilli district, Aydın Province
 Aksu, Sincik, a village in Sincik district, Adıyaman Province

Waterways
 Aksu River (disambiguation)
 Aksu Dam, an embankment dam near on the Çoruh River in Erzurum Province, Turkey

Other uses
 2010 Aksu bombing, a bombing incident in Aksu, Xinjiang, China
 Aksu Airport, an airport serving Aksu, a city in Xinjiang, China
 Aksu-Djabagly Nature Reserve, a nature reserve in Kazakhstan
 AK-74SU, a Russian assault rifle
 Battle of Aksu (717), a battle of the Muslim conquest of Transoxiana
 Battle of Aksu (1933), a minor battle in Aksu, Xinjiang, China
 G3014 Kuytun–Aksu Expressway, a planned expressway in Central Asia
 Aksu pattern, a motif found in tribal weavings especially those originating in northwestern Iran and Turkmenistan

See also
 Whitewater (disambiguation)